Rhode Island's 2nd congressional district is a congressional district in southern and western Rhode Island.  The district is currently represented by Democrat Seth Magaziner, who has represented the district since January 2023.

Composition 
The district includes:

 the following communities in Providence County:
 Burrillville, Cranston, Foster, Glocester, Johnston, Providence (precincts 2809–2812, 2840–2842, 2845–2846, 2851–2897, 8100–8102) and Scituate,
 all of Kent County
 all of Washington County

Historical district boundaries

Recent results from statewide elections

List of members representing the district

Election history

2012

2014

2016

2018

2020

2022

See also

Rhode Island's congressional districts
List of United States congressional districts

References 

 Congressional Biographical Directory of the United States 1774–present

02
Kent County, Rhode Island
Providence County, Rhode Island
Washington County, Rhode Island
Constituencies established in 1843
1843 establishments in Rhode Island